Mert Mutlu (born 9 February 1974) was a Turkish professional cyclist riding for team Brisaspor, where he also currently coaches Kemal Küçükbay.

Palmarès
Source:

1999
 1st  Overall,  Tour of Mevlana
2000
 1st  Overall,  Tour of Mevlana
2001
 1st  Overall,  Tour of Turkey
2003
 1st  Overall,  Tour of Turkey
 3rd Stage 3
 1st Stage 5
2004
 2nd Overall,   Turul României 
 3rd Overall,   Tour of Azerbaijan 
2005
 1st Stage 1,  Tour of Turkey
 3rd Stage 4,   Grand Prix Sunny Beach 
 3rd Stage 5,   Turul României 
 3rd Stage 6
2007
 2nd Road Elite,   Balkan Championshipsi 
 2nd Stage 3,  Eastern Black Sea Cup-Time Trial
 3rd Stage 2,  Tour of Mevlana
2008
 3rd Overall,  Aksaray-Time Trial 
 3rd Stage 3,  Bursa
2009
 3rd Stage 1,  Bursa
 3rd Stage 1, Prologue   Alanya-Time Trial 
 6th Overall,  Tour du Maroc
 4th Road Elite,  Turkish National Road Race Championships
2010
 4th Overall,  Marmaris-Time Trial 
 3rd Stage 1,  Fethiye Road Races-Time Trial
 3rd Overall 
 2nd Stage 6,   Tour of Azerbaijan 
 4th Overall
 10th Overall,  President Tour of Iran
 2nd Stage 1,  Tour of Trakya
 2nd Overall
 4th Elite,  Turkish National Time Trial Championships
 1st Stage 1,  Tour of Victory
 2nd Stage 2
 1st  Overall 
 1st Stage 1,  Tour of Marmara  
 2nd Overall
2011
 3rd Prologue Stage 1,  Tour of Isparta
 3rd Overall
 5th Road Elite,  Turkish National Time Trial Championships
 1st Stage 1,   Tour of Cappadocia
 1st  Overall
 1st Stage 1,   Çorum
 2nd Overall
 4th   Turkey Individual Classification
 5th Overall,  Tour of Victory
 3rd Stage 1,  Tour of Gallipoli
 8th Overall
2012
 9th,   Grand Prix Dobrich II

References

1974 births
Place of birth missing (living people)
Living people
Turkish male cyclists
Presidential Cycling Tour of Turkey winners
Presidential Cycling Tour of Turkey stage winners
Tour of Azerbaijan (Iran) winners
21st-century Turkish people